Hope Charter School is a free, public high school available to all 9th through 12th grade students.
Hope Charter School is located in the West Oak Lane section of Philadelphia, Pennsylvania.

External links

High schools in Philadelphia
Public high schools in Pennsylvania
Educational institutions established in 1992
West Oak Lane, Philadelphia
1992 establishments in Pennsylvania